Azucena "Nene" Honrado Vera-Perez was a Filipino film producer who was part of Sampaguita Pictures.

Early life
Azucena "Nene" Vera was born on May 22, 1917 in Camalig, Albay to José O. Vera and Dolores Vera.
Vera attended the University of Santo Tomas prior to the onset of World War II and pursued a degree in chemistry.

Career
Her father José O. Vera would entrust Sampaguita Pictures to her husband Jose Roxas Perez in the 1950s. She would help her husband manage the production studio. Under her husband's watch the studio produced 300 films. In 1980, Vera would take over as Sampaguita's president after the death of her mother. The studio helped produced actresses such as Gloria Romero, Susan Roces, Amalia Fuentes, and Gina Pareño.

Death
Vera-Perez died on May 14, 2014 at St. Luke's Medical Center in Quezon City due to pneumonia.

Personal life
Vera-Perez was married to Jose Roxas Perez. They first met when both were students at the University of Santo Tomas. Perez was a medicine student They had seven children. They got married December 10, 1941, amidst World War II and two days after the Pearl Harbor bombing.

References

Filipino film studio executives
University of Santo Tomas alumni
1917 births
2014 deaths